Marius Marro (born 16 December 1955) is a Swiss equestrian. He competed in the team eventing at the 1996 Summer Olympics.

References

1955 births
Living people
Swiss male equestrians
Olympic equestrians of Switzerland
Equestrians at the 1996 Summer Olympics
Place of birth missing (living people)
20th-century Swiss people